Lancelot Bruce Mills (24 December 1901 – 19 October 1936) was an Australian rules footballer who played with Geelong in the Victorian Football League (VFL).

Notes

External links 

1901 births
1936 deaths
Australian rules footballers from Victoria (Australia)
Geelong Football Club players